This is a list of properties and districts in Burke County, Georgia that are listed on the National Register of Historic Places (NRHP).

Current listings

|}

References

Burke
Burke County, Georgia
National Register of Historic Places in Burke County, Georgia